Reus is a Dutch, German and Catalan surname. (De) reus means "(the) giant" in middle and modern Dutch, and the surname  has a descriptive origin. In Germany, the name may have its origin in the Middle Low German word ruse for a fish trap, or from a regional  term reuse for a small stream or channel. People with this surname include:

Christian Reus-Smit (born 1961), Australian international relations scholar
Francisco Reus-Froylan (1919–2008), Puerto Rican Episcopalian Bishop
 (1872–19350, Dutch architect
Hesterine de Reus (born 1961), Dutch football player and coach
Johann Baptist Reus (1868–1947), German Jesuit priest, missionary and theologian in Brazil
Julian Reus (born 1988), German sprinter
Kai Reus (born 1985), Dutch cyclist
Marco Reus (born 1989), German football forward
 (born 1969), Dutch volleyball player
Ruben Reus (born 1984), Dutch figure skater
Timo Reus (born 1974), German football goalkeeper
Two brothers "Sastre Reus" from Majorca:
Luis Sastre Reus (born 1986), Spanish football midfielder
Rafel Sastre Reus (born 1975), Spanish football defender

See also
Reuss (surname)
Reus

References

Catalan-language surnames
Dutch-language surnames
German-language surnames